Dan Seals was an American country music artist. Formerly one half of the pop duo England Dan & John Ford Coley, Seals split from the duo in 1980 and began a country music career. As a solo artist, Seals released 13 studio albums, six compilation albums, and 37 singles. Eleven of his singles reached Number One on the U.S. Billboard country singles charts, including nine consecutive Number Ones between 1985 and 1989. Seals' best-selling album in the U.S. is 1987's The Best, certified platinum by the RIAA.

Studio albums

1980s albums

1990s albums

2000s albums

Compilation albums

Singles

1980s

1990s

Other singles

Featured singles

Music videos

See also
England Dan & John Ford Coley

Notes

A^ "Bop" also peaked at number 10 on the U.S. Billboard Hot Adult Contemporary Tracks chart and number 6 on the Canadian RPM Adult Contemporary chart.
B^ The videos for "God Must Be a Cowboy," "Big Wheels in the Moonlight," and the concept version of "Everything That Glitters (Is Not Gold)" were all filmed specially for Seals' 1991 home video compilation, A Portrait.

References

Country music discographies
 
 
Discographies of American artists